A  is a mounted cattle herdsman in the Camargue delta in Provence, southern France. The work is akin to that of the Mexican , the North American cowboy, the Tuscan buttero or the Portuguese . Gardians ride Camargue horses.

See also
 Camargue cattle
 Camargue equitation
 Manade

References

Further reading 

   Louis Figuier (née Juliette Bouscaren), Le gardian de la Camargue - Mos de Lavêne, coll. « Auteurs célèbres », C. Marpon et E. Flammarion, Paris, 1889, 249 p.
 Pierre Lanéry d’Arc, Les maisons-types de la Provence, chap. 35 de Enquête sur les conditions de l'habitation en France. Les maisons-types, t. 1, Ministère de l'instruction publique, Ernest Leroux, Paris, 1894, pp. 207–248.
 de) Flandresy Jeanne, Charles-Roux Jules, Mellier Etienne, Le livre d'or de la Camargue, tome I, Le pays; les mas et les châteaux; le Rhône camarguais, Librairie A. Lemerre, Paris, 1916, 437 p.
 Fernand Benoit, Les chaumières à abside de la Camargue : la cabane, origine, description, mode de construction, dans Revue du folklore français, t. 9, 1938, No 2, avril-juin, pp. 51–53, pl. h. t.
 Fernand Benoit, Les coutumes, l'habitation et les fêtes [en Camargue], dans Le Chêne, numéro spécial, No 16, 1938, pp. 100–112.
 (d')Elly Rul, La Camargue gardiane, Michel Delaveau, Paris, 1938, 165 p.
 Carle Naudot, Ethnographie du pays d'Arles. Contribution au folklore de Camargue, Le Seden, 1947.
 Henri Marc, Carle Naudot, Victor Quenin, Terre de camargue - Terro Camarguenco, Arthaud, Grenoble-Paris, 1948, 159 p.
 Jean-Luc Massot, Maisons rurales et vie paysanne en Provence, Serg, 1975.
 René Baranger, En Camargue avec Baroncelli, l'auteur, Clichy, 1983, 164 p.
 Guy Châtel, La selle gardiane et le harnachement camarguais, dans Courrier du Parc, No 45-46, 1995.

External links

 Cabanes entièrement en roseau des années 1900
 Texte publié à l’occasion de l’exposition « Cabanes de Camargue » réalisée par le Parc Naturel Régional de Camargue en 1983 

Animal husbandry occupations
Camargue
Horse-related professions and professionals
Horse history and evolution